Eshgaft-e Rumeh (also Romanized as Eshgaft-e Rūmeh; also known as Eshkaft-e Rūmeh) is a village in Jowzar Rural District, in the Central District of Mamasani County, Fars Province, Iran. At the 2006 census, its population was 91, in 23 families.

References 

Populated places in Mamasani County